Allium fasciculatum is a species of onions known from the Himalayas of Bhutan, Sikkim, Nepal, and the Chinese provinces of Qinghai, Sichuan and Tibet. It grows at elevations of 2200–5400 m.

Allium fasciculatum has thick roots and fibrous bulbs. Scapes are up to 40 cm long. Umbels are spherical with large numbers of white flowers.

References

fasciculatum
Onions
Flora of China
Flora of Assam (region)
Flora of East Himalaya
Flora of Nepal
Plants described in 1906